Mauro Malang Santos (January 20, 1928 – June 10, 2017), commonly known by the mononym Malang, was a Filipino and award-winning cartoonist, illustrator, and fine arts painter. As a comics artist he is best known for the series Kosme the Cop, Chain Gang Charlie and Beelzebub.

Family 
Malang was the son of Dan Santos and Juliana Malang. He married Mary San Pedro, with whom he has four children including painters Steve Santos and Soler Santos.

Education
Malang started learning how to draw from Teodoro Buenaventura, a private tutor, when he was ten years old. He studied at the Antonio Regidor Elementary School in 1934, and attended Arellano High School in 1941.  For one semester, Malang studied at the College of Fine Arts of the University of the Philippines in 1946. He stopped attending formal school at the age of 19 in order to work for the art department of the Manila Chronicle. While with the newspaper, he apprenticed under cartoonist Liborio "Gat" Gatbonton. During 1972, Malang attended art classes at the Otis Art Institute in Los Angeles, California, under a three-month scholarship

Career

At the Manila Chronicles, Malang created Kosme, the Cop, Retired (1947-1965), the country's first English-language daily comic strip, for the evening edition of the newspaper.  In 1955, Malang established the Bughouse, a gallery specializing in cartoons.  Malang established the gallery together with cartoonist colleagues such as Liborio Gatbonton, Larry Alcala, Hugo Yonzon, and Elmer Abustan.   In 1966, Malang launched Art for the Masses, a project that brought printmaking to a larger number of artwork enthusiasts at affordable prices.

Awards
In 1957, Philippine Art Gallery founder, Lyd Arguilla, included Malang in the Twelve Artists in the Philippines-Who's Who. In 1958, the Art Directors Guild of the Philippines conferred Malang the Award for Editorial Design. Malang won in competitions sponsored by the Society of Philippine Illustrators and Cartoonists.  In 1964, the Society of Philippine Illustrators and Cartoonists named Malang as the Artist of the Year.  Malang won awards in the annual art competitions held by the Art Association of the Philippines, namely for his Street Fight (Second Prize, 1951), Traffic (Third Prize, 1953), The Yellow Sky (Honorable Mention, 1959), Quarter Moon (Second Prize), and Gate to Intramuros (Honorable Mention, 1963).  In 1963, Malang was included among the Ten Outstanding Young Men of the Philippines. In 1981, the City of Manila awarded him the Patnubay ng Sining at Kalinangan ("Guide of Arts and Culture") award.

See also
Fernando Amorsolo
Juan Luna
Félix Resurrección Hidalgo

References

External links
  Lambiek Comiclopedia article

1928 births
2017 deaths
Filipino comics artists
Filipino comics writers
Filipino illustrators
Filipino cartoonists
Filipino painters
People from Santa Cruz, Manila
Artists from Metro Manila
Writers from Metro Manila
Recipients of the Presidential Medal of Merit (Philippines)